Schneider Children's Medical Center of Israel, founded in 1992, is a paediatric hospital focused on children's health, particularly organ transplantation and cancers. Schneider treats infants, children, teens, and young adults up to age 18 and for some conditions, age 21.

Overview
 7 floors
 35,000 sq. meters (376,736 sq. feet)
 271 beds including 50 for day care
 44% critical care and special care beds
 1,500 employees
 350 Physicians with advanced specialty and subspecialty paediatric training
 550 Pediatric Nurses and Nurse Assistants
 100 Paramedical Staff (Social Workers, Physical and Occupational Therapists, Psychologists and Dieticians)
 6 operating theaters
 2 Cardiac Catheterization Labs
 3 specially oriented intensive care units
 The combined skills of 800 health professionals

 
Annual Activities
 275,000 visits and treatments
 54,000 visits to the Emergency Medicine Department (ER) - busiest in the country
 13,500 admissions, amounting to some 78,000 hospitalization days
 8,200 surgeries including 500 cardiac and vascular surgeries and about 220 neurosurgeries
 440 dialysis treatments
 1,200 catheterizations
 60 cochlear implants
 40 organ transplantations

Online Pediatricians
 Digital medical responses after-hours
 Pediatric medical consultations via telephone and videoconferencing

History
On October 29, 1991, the Schneider Children's Medical Center of Israel was founded on the hospital grounds, the largest such facility in Israel. It opened to the public in April 1992. It spans an area of 35,000 sq. meters. It was named after two major benefactors, Irving and Helen Schneider. It was designed by Marvin Bostin and Jerry Switzer.

Treatments

National Referral Center
 Hematology-Oncology
 Cardiology
 Endocrinology & Childhood Diabetes
 Organ and Bone Marrow Transplantation

New Clinical Genetics
 Diseases and genes discovered
 Chromosomal microarray
 Exome sequencing

Else
 Endoscopic repair of laryngeal cleft in 2.5 kg preemie
 Video capsule endoscopy for children <2 years
 Artificial pancreas trials outside hospital
 Joint ancestor gene discovery in CDA-II patients
 Local anesthesia for meatal stenosis
 Defibrillator implanted in 4-month-old
 New genes discovered for mental retardation
 Open-heart surgery in 800gm preemie
 Percutaneous aortic valve replacement
 Multiple organ transplant

Academic & Research
 Two Israel Prize laureates for Medical Research
 Affiliated with the Sackler School of Medicine, Tel Aviv University
 5 physicians on Medical Management Faculty at Tel Aviv University, Sackler Faculty of Medicine (highest percentage per capita of all 16 TAU-affiliated teaching hospitals)
 50% staff on Faculty
 15% hold title of Professor
 In 2020, Schneider Children’s Medical Center and Weizmann Institute of Science aim to establish the Schneider-Weizmann Center for Research on Child and Adult Health.

Support

Friends of Schneider is a non-profit Friends Association that has been supporting Schneider Children’s Medical Center of Israel since its foundation. The Association was established to promote the development and advancement of the hospital and works to raise funds for construction, acquisition of medical equipment, research grants, and special projects.

See also
 Paediatrics

References

External links
 Official website
 Schneider Children's Medical Center of Israel on Linkedin

Children's hospitals
Hospitals in Israel
Hospitals established in 1992
Medical research institutes in Israel
Pediatric organizations